Laurie Heineman (born August 4, 1948 in Chicago) is an American actress. She starred as Myra in the 1973 drama film Save the Tiger and as Sharlene Frame on the soap opera Another World (1975-77), for which she received Daytime Emmy Award for Outstanding Lead Actress in a Drama Series.

Life and career
Heineman was born in Chicago, Illinois. She grew up in Rye, New York, and attended the Midland elementary School, where her career was influenced by celebrated teacher Albert Cullum; and graduated from Rye High School before attending Radcliffe College. In 1961, she made her television debut starring as Mary Jackson on the daytime soap opera, As the World Turns. She left the soap in 1966. As a child she also appeared in the prime time dramas Naked City and East Side/West Side, as well as on live television  in the U.S. Steel Hour.

In 1973, Heineman made her big screen debut starring alongside Jack Lemmon and Jack Gilford in the Academy Awards-winning drama film Save the Tiger. She later appeared in films Fore Play (1975) and The Lady in Red (1979). On television, she originated the role of Sharlene Frame Watts Matthews on the soap opera Another World from 1975 to 77. She was awarded the Daytime Emmy Award for Outstanding Lead Actress in a Drama Series in 1978.

Heineman starred in the made-for-television movies Terror on the 40th Floor (1974), Mad Bull (1977) and the miniseries Loose Change (1978) also starring Cristina Raines, and Studs Lonigan (1979).  She made guest appearances on Kaz, Lou Grant, Hart to Hart, The Incredible Hulk, The Streets of San Francisco, Rafferty, and Law & Order. Heineman has appeared on, off and off-off Broadway and in theatrical productions around the nation, including comedies, dramas, and numerous Shakespearean productions. She was an original member of the improv group, "The Proposition", also starring Fred Grandy and Jane Curtin. 
In 2015, Heineman appeared as Constance M. Sweeney, a judge at the center of the clerical sex abuse trials in the drama film, Spotlight.

Heineman teaches Shakespeare and other classics to home schoolers, and runs workshops at libraries and private events throughout New England and in New York City. Heineman is a board certified art therapist who brings spoken word events to seniors, and she is an experienced teacher, and the co-author of a book on teaching Shakespeare.

References

External links

1948 births
Living people
20th-century American actresses
21st-century American actresses
Actresses from Chicago
American child actresses
American film actresses
American soap opera actresses
American stage actresses
American television actresses
Art therapists
Daytime Emmy Award winners
Daytime Emmy Award for Outstanding Lead Actress in a Drama Series winners
Drama teachers